Plevna March or Osman Pasha March was written in order to commemorate Osman Pasha, who led Ottoman troops in the Siege of Plevna.

History
It was sung under the name of Old Plevna March by Hafız Yaşar Bey and his group in 1910 (not definite) and underwent some changes before it took its final version. According to Yaşar Bey, it had been written by Mehmet Ali Bey. According to other sources, it was written by Mithat Efendi and composed by Armenian composer Tigran Chukhajian. There are still other sources that claim the song was written by Georges Pera and composed by Edouard Taxim where these names only represent the nicknames.

Its tone is con tristezza, which means with sadness.

Lyrics

References

External links
 Sound file (by the Harmonic Band of the TAF)
 Sound file (by Hafız Yaşar Bey)

Turkish music
March music
Pleven